Stenosemis is a genus of flowering plants belonging to the family Apiaceae.

Its native range is Southern Africa.

Species
Species:

Stenosemis angustifolia 
Stenosemis caffra

References

Apioideae
Apioideae genera